Peter Richard Oswald Tschugguel, known by the pen names Peter von Tramin and Peter von Kleynn, (9 May 1932 – 14 July 1981) was an Austrian writer.

Biography 
Tschugguel was born on 9 May 1932 in Vienna. He is a member of the von Tschugguel family, who were part of the Austrian nobility. He studied law and then worked as a bank clerk and translator.

Tschugguel was a short story writer and novelist. His pen name comes from his family's ancestral noble title, Baron Tschugguel von Tramin. While use of noble titles and nobiliary particles in the surname have been illegal since the Austrian nobility was abolished in 1919, the use of nobiliary particles in stage names and pen names is permitted.

In 1963 he was awarded the Austrian State Prize for European Literature.

Tschugguel died on 14 July 1981.

Bibliography

Novels 
 Herr über 1000 Gehirne, 1958
 Die Herren Söhne, 1962
 Die Tür im Fenster, 1967

Short stories 
 Divertimento, 1963
 Taschen voller Geld und andere Erzählungen, 1970
 Der Kanalrat, 1974

References

External links 
 Peter von Tramin in the DEUTSCHEN NATIONALBIBLIOTHEK
 Peter von Tramin in the Library of Congress

1932 births
1981 deaths
20th-century Austrian male writers
20th-century Austrian novelists
Austrian male short story writers
Barons of Austria
Tschugguel family
Writers from Vienna